The 1966 British Sports Car Championship was the third season of the British Sports Car Championship. The season was dominated by Brabham's Formula One driver, Denny Hulme, by winning the first five races of the season, abroad Sidney Taylor's Lola T70 Mk2. This model of car was also victorious in the remaining two races, in the hands of the 1964 World Champion, John Surtees.

Results

References

British Sports Car Championship
Sports Car